Santiago 'Santi' Castillejo Castillejo (born 5 September 1971) is a Spanish retired footballer who played as a striker, currently manager of CA Osasuna B.

He was the all-time scoring leader in Segunda División B, with 184 goals in representation of seven clubs. His La Liga input consisted of 11 games, with Osasuna.

After retiring in 2008, Castillejo worked as a manager.

Playing career
Born in Valtierra, Castillejo started his football career with local CA Osasuna, being mainly associated with the reserves and scoring 20 Segunda División B goals with them in the 1992–93 season. He made his La Liga debut with the first team on 14 March 1993, appearing as a late substitute in a 1–0 home win against Real Zaragoza, and featured in just ten games in his only full campaign, which ended in relegation; he was also loaned to Deportivo Alavés during his spell.

Released by the Navarrese in summer 1996, Castillejo resumed his career in the Segunda División but also in the third tier, with CD Numancia, CD Castellón, Gimnàstic de Tarragona– he netted 21 times as the club achieved promotion to division two in 2001, best in Group III, second overall – UB Conquense, CD Leganés and CF Reus Deportiu, retiring in 2008 at the age of 37.

Coaching career
Castillejo started working as a manager immediately after retiring, initially being an assistant with Reus in Tercera División. He was appointed head coach for 2009–10, leading the team to promotion in his second season.

Castillejo agreed on a return to former club Gimnàstic in late May 2013, signing ahead of the 2013–14 campaign. On 4 November, he was relieved of his duties.

On 26 June 2014, Castillejo took the reins of UE Llagostera, recently promoted to the second level. He was dismissed on 21 October, after leaving them in the relegation zone.

On 22 February 2016, Castillejo was named at the helm of UE Olot in division three. On 7 June he was appointed at FC Ascó, and renewed his contract the following 13 May.

Castillejo returned to his first club Osasuna on 19 June 2018, as manager of the B team.

Managerial statistics

References

External links

1971 births
Living people
Spanish footballers
Footballers from Navarre
Association football forwards
La Liga players
Segunda División players
Segunda División B players
Tercera División players
CA Osasuna B players
CA Osasuna players
Deportivo Alavés players
CD Numancia players
CD Castellón footballers
Gimnàstic de Tarragona footballers
UB Conquense footballers
CD Leganés players
CF Reus Deportiu players
Spanish football managers
Segunda División managers
Segunda División B managers
Tercera División managers
Segunda Federación managers
CF Reus Deportiu managers
Gimnàstic de Tarragona managers
UE Costa Brava managers
UE Olot managers